Let's Go Sunshine is the fifth studio album by British rock band The Kooks. The follow-up to the 2014 album Listen, it was released on 31 August 2018 through Lonely Cat, making it the band's first album release on an independent label  The album charted at number 9 on the UK Albums Chart, giving the band their highest charted release for a decade after their second album Konk which reached Number One in 2008. It is the third and last studio album recorded with bassist Pete Denton, whose departure from the band was announced on 3 January 2019.

The album contains the five released singles "All the Time", "No Pressure", "Fractured and Dazed", "Four Leaf Clover" and the most recent single "Chicken Bone".

Recording

Luke Pritchard had already begun talking about The Kooks' fifth album in 2017 while promoting the band's greatest hits compilation, The Best of... So Far, which contained two new songs that were produced by Brandon Friesen who was also overseeing the recording of their new album along with Chris Seefried. Consisting of songs written by Pritchard while the other band members spent time with their families, the new album was deemed to be more of a band effort, as opposed to Listen which was constructed individually.

Initially, the band had started recording for their fifth album in 2015 with the intent of continuing the flow from the previous record Listen. Unhappy with the results they decided to scrap the material in favor of starting over in a new direction.

Pritchard stated that he was on a mission to write the best songs he'd ever written before bringing them to the band, citing Rubber Soul, Lola and Definitely Maybe as inspirations. He had also gone through some heartbreak and fallen in love during the writing process. The band then decided to write more of the music, particularly the lyrics, before entering the studio to record, as opposed to writing on the fly in the studio as with their previous record.

The Kooks resisted suggestions to become more modern-sounding or to choose particular producers. This informed their decision to work with Friesen, who they felt was an outsider like they were.

Originally, Pritchard had wanted to name the album Weight of the World after one of its songs, as it represented what the entire album stood for. In the end he opted for Let's Go Sunshine which felt more positive.

Critical reception

Upon the release of "Let's Go Sunshine" critical reception to the album was mixed. Review aggregate website Metacritic scored the album 59/100 based on 7 reviews. In All Music's review by Neil Z. Yeung said of the album; " a mostly tame affair packed with patient groovers and some lush production" although he was slightly critical of the albums sentimentality; "it gets bogged down by the contemplative exercises, but resuscitated by the festival-sized anthems punctuated throughout". Clash gave the album a mixed review. Writing; "Let’s Go Sunshine’ is a solid album, though not groundbreaking" but did complement the band on trying new things; "whilst it’s not The Kooks we know and love, it’s still mostly remains true to the indie sound whilst being experimental in parts". Another mixed review came from Exclaim! reviewer Beth Bowles. She was critical of the band apparently playing it safe; "Let's Go Sunshine scarcely veers into experimental territory, and as a result, the tracks lack unique characteristics" and went on to criticise the album as "boring" stating; "While collectively the songs are happy-go-lucky, giving off a carefree tone, at 15 tracks, Let's Go Sunshine gets boring quickly".

Track listing

Personnel
Luke Pritchard – vocals, guitar
Hugh Harris – guitar, backing vocals
Peter Denton – bass guitar, backing vocals
Alexis Nunez – drums, percussion, backing vocals

Charts

Release history

References

2018 albums
The Kooks albums